La Tour Montparnasse Infernale is a 2001 French crime comedy film directed by Charles Nemes and co-written and starred by Eric Judor, Ramzy Bedia and Pierre-François Martin-Laval. When it came out in cinemas in Canada, it was translated into Don't Die Too Hard in reference to Die Hard. The movie is a box office success, grossing 20.6 million for a budget of 9.6 million. A prequel, La Tour 2 contrôle infernale was released in 2016.

Plot
Éric and Ramzy are working as window washers at the Montparnasse skyscraper in Paris. Eric thinks that he has a date with beautiful Marie-Joëlle (real name is Stéphanie Lanceval), They stay at work late, but a gang of terrorists seize the tower and take its late-night occupants (including Marie-Joëlle) hostage. Knowing that only they can save the day, Éric and Ramzy swing into action.

Cast
Eric Judor and Ramzy Bedia as the windows washers
Marina Foïs as Stéphanie Lanceval (Marie-Joëlle) 
Serge Riaboukine as Michel Vignault a.k.a. Machin
Michel Puterflam as Lanceval
Bô Gaultier de Kermoal as Ming
Pierre Semmler as Hans
Edgar Givry as Greg
Georges Trillat as Peter
Bruce Johnson as Chris
Laurence Pollet-Villard as Sylvie
Pierre-François Martin-Laval as Tran
Olivier Balazuc as Fils 4 Lanceval
Jean-Claude Dauphin as Le commissaire
Étienne Fauduet as Séparatiste corse
Benoît Giros as Jean-Louis
François Goizé as Pilote hélicoptère
Vincent Haquin as Chef GIGN
Thibault Lacroix as Fils 1 Lanceval
Grégory Lemoigne as Fils 3 Lanceval
Frederic Moreau as Séparatiste basque
Gyuri Nemes as Séparatiste Breton
Marc Raffat as Pilote hélicoptère
Lionel Roux as Homme du RAID
Philippe Schwartz as Fils 5 Lanceval
Volodia Serre as Fils 2 Lanceval
Joey Starr as Youston
Omar Sy as Taxi driver
Fred Testot as Policier fumeur

References

External links
 

French crime comedy films
2001 films
2001 comedy films
Films set in Paris
2000s French films
2000s French-language films